A groatland, also known as a fourpenceland, fourpennyland or “Còta bàn” (meaning "white coat") was a Scottish land measurement. It was so called, because the annual rent paid on it was a Scottish “groat” (coin).

See also 
 Obsolete Scottish units of measurement
 In the East Highlands:
 Rood
 Scottish acre = 4 roods
 Oxgang (Damh-imir) = the area an ox could plow in a year (around 20 acres)
 Ploughgate (?) = 8 oxgangs
 Daugh (Dabhach) = 4 ploughgates
 In the West Highlands:
 Markland (Marg-fhearann) = 8 Ouncelands (varied)
 Ounceland (Tir-unga) =20 Pennylands
 Pennyland (Peighinn) = basic unit; sub-divided into half penny-land and farthing-land 
 (Other terms in use; Quarterland (Ceathramh): variable value; Groatland (Còta bàn)

References

Obsolete Scottish units of measurement
Units of area